Lillehammer Hospital is a general hospital situated in Lillehammer, Norway. It is part of Innlandet Hospital Trust, part of the Southern and Eastern Norway Regional Health Authority.

References

Hospitals in Norway
Lillehammer
Oppland County Municipality
Heliports in Norway
Airports in Innlandet